The monument to Vittorio Emanuele II is located in Turin, in the Largo of the same name, at the junction between Corso Vittorio Emanuele II and Corso Galileo Ferraris.

It is dedicated to Vittorio Emanuele II, the first king of Italy. It was wanted by his son, King Umberto I, and paid him at his own expense. The monument, in bronze and granite, is the work of architect Pietro Costa. It was erected between 1882 and 1899, through many contrasts with the Turin municipal government.

It was inaugurated on September 9, 1899, twenty years after the death of the king. The festivities were great on the day of the inauguration; Corso Vittorio Emanuele II and Rome were illuminated at party.

The king's statue rises majestically on tall Doric columns. In the sculptural groups at the base of the monument are unity, brotherhood, work and freedom. The monument reaches a considerable height of 39 meters. Its height is popularly called "the King on the Roofs" or "Barba Vigiu".

References

Buildings and structures in Turin
Monuments and memorials in Italy
Victor Emmanuel II of Italy